Grant Gilchrist (born 9 August 1990) is a Scottish rugby union player who plays at lock for Edinburgh Rugby in the United Rugby Championship.

Background
Gilchrist was schooled at Lornshill Academy, and played with Alloa RFC before moving on to Stirling County RFC.

Initially an Elite Development player at Edinburgh Rugby and following a stint in New Zealand as part of the John Macphail Scholarship, he made his first senior appearance in a 34–13 win over Cardiff Blues in September 2011. In 2015 he was made the club's vice-captain. In August 2016, Edinburgh Rugby named him and Stuart McInally as their co-captains for the coming season.

International career
Gilchrist represented Scotland at under-18, under-19, under-20 levels. He received his first full cap for Scotland against France in the 2013 Six Nations Championship at the Stade de France, aged 22. He was not selected to play in any of Scotland's 2014 Six Nations matches under Scott Johnson. Vern Cotter selected him for the 2014 Scotland rugby union tour of the Americas and South Africa. He captained Scotland for the first time on 20 June 2014 against Argentina, having scored his first international try against Canada the previous week.

Gilchrist was named as captain for Scotland's 2014 Autumn Test campaign, but was forced to withdraw the same week of that announcement when he broke his arm while playing for Edinburgh against Lyon. Complications with this injury also led him to miss the 2015 Six Nations Championship and the rest of the 2014–15 Pro12 season.

References

External links
 
 profile at Scottish Rugby
 profile at Edinburgh Rugby
 http://www.scottishrugby.org/content/view/2089/2/

1990 births
Living people
Scottish rugby union players
Scotland international rugby union players
Edinburgh Rugby players
Rugby union locks
Rugby union players from Stirling
Alloa RFC players